Joseph Alfred Roussel (January 12, 1921 – November 8, 2015) was a Canadian politician. He served in the Legislative Assembly of New Brunswick from 1974 to 1982, as a Liberal member for the constituency of Restigouche West. In 2007, he was awarded the Ordre de la Pléiade.

References

New Brunswick Liberal Association MLAs
1921 births
2015 deaths